Akeel is both a surname and a given name. Notable people with the name include:

 Shereef Akeel (born 1965), American lawyer
 Akeel Bilgrami (born 1950), Indian-born philosopher
 Akeel Al Saffar, Iraqi politician
 Akeel Lynch (born 1994), American football player
 Akeel Morris (born 1992), American baseball player